The C. Segelke Building, at 1065 17th Ave. in Columbus, Nebraska, was built in 1887.  It was listed on the National Register of Historic Places in 1982.

It served as the Columbus Bottling Works and, in later years, as the Columbus Coca-Cola Bottling Company.  Its architecture is simplified commercial Italianate in style.

The listing included a second contributing building, a long, low storage shed across the alley behind the main building.

References

External links

National Register of Historic Places in Platte County, Nebraska
Italianate architecture in Nebraska
Buildings and structures completed in 1887